The 2022 Stephen F. Austin Lumberjacks football team represented Stephen F. Austin State University in the 2022 NCAA Division I FCS football season. The Lumberjacks played their home games at Homer Bryce Stadium in Nacogdoches, Texas, and competed in the Western Athletic Conference (WAC). They were led by fourth-year head coach Colby Carthel.

Schedule
Stephen F. Austin University, Athletics Department announced the 2022 football schedule on February 9, 2022.

References

Stephen F. Austin
Stephen F. Austin Lumberjacks football seasons
Western Athletic Conference football champion seasons
Stephen F. Austin Lumberjacks football